Chlorosarin is a chemical precursor used in the final step of one method for the production of the nerve agent sarin.  Also known as O-isopropyl methylphosphonochloridate and isopropyl methylphosphonic chloride, it has a molecular weight of 156.55 g/mol and a molecular formula of C4H10ClO2P.

Safety
Chlorosarin will produce effects similar to those of sarin if it is absorbed into body, but they are less severe. However, like sarin, it is highly toxic and small doses of it would be lethal. The Chemical Weapons Convention also lists chlorosarin as well as other chemicals such chlorosoman and QL as controlled substances in Schedule 1.

Synthesis
Like GB, ClGB presents a varied preparation route. Overall, it is a lower cost chemical warfare agent than sarin. ClGB was one of the final intermediates of step five of the DMHP process, being known as a raw impurity and as a final precursor.

Chlorosarin can be synthesized from diisopropyl methylphosphonate (DIMP) and phosgene.

References

Nerve agent precursors
Isopropyl esters